Robert R. Benton (April 10, 1924 – December 7, 2003) was an American set decorator. He was nominated for four Academy Awards in the category Best Art Direction.

Selected filmography
Benton was nominated for four Academy Awards for Best Art Direction:
 The Oscar (1966)
 The Slender Thread (1965)
 The Americanization of Emily (1964)
 Hud (1963)

References

External links

1924 births
2003 deaths
American set decorators
Film people from Los Angeles
Deaths from respiratory failure